Maracha is a town in the West Nile sub-region, in Northern Uganda. It is the main municipal, administrative and commercial center of Maracha District and the headquarters of the district are located there. The district is named after the town.

Location
The coordinates of Maracha Town are 3°17'18.0"N, 30°56'27.0"E (Latitude:3.288337; Longitude:30.940828).

Points of interest
 The Vurra–Arua–Koboko–Oraba Road passes through the middle of town in a north to south configuration.
 Maracha central market
 Maracha District Local government offices
 Maracha Town Council offices

See also
Maracha District
West Nile sub-region
Northern Region, Uganda

References

External links
 Maracha children leave school to sell drugs

Populated places in Northern Region, Uganda
Maracha District
West Nile sub-region